A swimsuit competition, more commonly now called a bikini contest, is a beauty contest which is judged and ranked while contestants wear a swimsuit, typically a bikini. One of the judging criteria is the physical attractiveness of the contestants. The Big Four international beauty pageants have included examples of such a competition.

Bikini contests have sometimes been organized or sponsored by companies for marketing purposes or to find new models for their products, with the contests being presented as a form of adult entertainment. Swimwear competitions have formed a part of beauty pageants, such as the Miss Earth and Miss World pageants, and sponsors have included commercial brands such as Hawaiian Tropic. Contests have also been held in bars and nightclubs, during intermissions in boxing or wrestling matches and at car shows. Bodybuilding and fitness competitions have evolved to include a bikini division. Participants in such contests may be competing for prizes including trophies, money, and modeling contracts.

Types of bikini contests

History 
In the United States, beauty pageants of women in bathing costumes became popular from the 1880s. However, such events were not regarded as  respectable. Beauty contests became more respectable with the first modern "Miss America" contest held in 1921, though less respectable beauty contests continued to be held. Miss America dropped the swimsuit competition in 2018, as part of a general change to avoid judging women based on physical appearance.

Contest organization 

Bikini contests have sometimes been organised or sponsored by companies for marketing purposes or to find new models for their products. Miss Hawaiian Tropic is organized by Playtex to promote "Hawaiian Tropic", its suntan lotion. NOPI runs the annual Hot Import Nights bikini contest, which is held in conjunction with the import car-show in Atlanta, Georgia, and the annual Hooter's bikini competition.

There are some swimsuit competitions which aim to judge the beauty of a single part of body, such as female buttocks (for example, the Miss Bum Bum contest held in Brazil, and the Miss Reef contest held in several South American countries).

Controversies

Miss World contest 
The first Miss World contest was organized by Eric Morley in 1951 as a promotion for swimwear at the Festival of Britain. The press welcomed the spectacle and referred to it as Miss World. When the winner Kiki Håkansson from Sweden was crowned in a bikini, countries with religious traditions threatened to withdraw delegates. The bikinis were outlawed and evening gowns introduced instead. Håkansson remains the only Miss World crowned in a bikini, a crowning that was condemned by the Pope. The bikini was banned from Miss World beauty pageants after the controversy.

Bikinis reappeared in later contests amid additional controversy. In the 1970s and 1980s, the contest was regularly picketed by feminist protesters. The pageant disappeared for a while and in 1996, when the Miss World contest was held in Bangalore, India, dozens of Indian groups opposed to the event claimed that the contest degraded women by featuring them in bikinis. Social activist Subhashini Ali commented, "It's not an IQ test. Neither is it a charity show. It's a beauty contest in which these things have been added on as sops." The protests were so intense that the organizers were finally compelled to shift the venue of the swimsuit round to the Seychelles. Countering these claims, the contest organizer says that the organization has raised £300 million for charity in many of the countries where it operates since 2000.

In 2013, the Miss World event was hosted by Indonesia, the world's largest Muslim-majority country. The country's top Muslim clerical body, the Indonesian Ulema Council, suggested that the event should be cancelled because it promotes "hedonism, materialism, and consumerism," and is nothing but "an excuse to show women's body parts that should remain covered." The organizers later announced that the bikini would be replaced by one-piece swimsuits and sarongs, traditional beachwear on the resort island of Bali. Pageant Chairwoman Julia Morley explained, "I do not want to upset or get anyone in a situation where we are being disrespectful."

Critics accuse the Miss World organizers of caving to extremist pressures. They point out that Bali is a destination for tourists from across the world who often wear minimal swimwear.

Brooke Magnanti argued that the decision to yield to religious fundamentalists was not a victory for feminism:

Donald Trump, who owned the Miss Universe beauty pageant until it was acquired by William Morris Endeavor, a competitor to the Miss World contest, was delighted to learn of the rival organization's decision. He told Fox News, "Well, I own Miss Universe, so I'm actually very happy about it—because if Miss World doesn't have bikinis, their ratings go right down the tubes."

Miss Earth 
Vida Samadzai was the 2003 Afghan contestant for the Miss Earth title. She was severely condemned by both the Afghan authorities and community for seeking the title.  Samadzai was born in Afghanistan but raised in the United States. She was living in India at the time of the contest. The Afghan Supreme Court banned swimsuit contests and said that appearing naked in beauty contests is completely un-Islamic, and is against Afghan tradition, human honour and dignity. Habiba Sarabi, the Afghan women affairs minister, said Samadzai's  semi-naked appearance "is not women's freedom but in my opinion is to entertain men". Afghanistan's embassy in Washington DC declared that claims by Afghan American Samadzai to represent Afghanistan is baseless. Samadzai, the second woman to be crowned Miss Afghanistan after Zohra Daoud's crowning in 1972, received a number of death threats and had to be under the protection of the FBI for three months. She said that she was a bit uncomfortable wearing the "70s style red bikini", and was aware of the risks involved.

In the Miss Earth 2017, Carousel Productions, the organizer of the pageant, was criticized for objectifying women when the delegates wore swimsuits in the Beauty of Figure and Form, with their faces concealed by a veil, a segment first introduced in the Miss Philippines Earth 2017 pageant. The event was one of the three preliminary judging segments of the pageant that include Poise and Beauty of Face and Environmental and Intelligence Competition. The pageant organizer defended that the "beauty of figure and form" segment was intended to promote strict impartiality during pre-judging by focusing on the contestants' curves, execution and not beautiful face.

Children's bikini contest 
Miss Tanguita, which translates as "Miss Child Bikini", is held in Barbosa, Santader, Colombia as annual part of the "del Rio Suarez" Festival. The organisers deny the allegations that the competition is a camouflage for sexual exploitation, and instead describe it as an awareness event about the importance of children's fitness. Activists say that the competition, though legal, abuses the human rights of minors.

Miss Teen USA 
Beginning in 2016, the Miss Teen USA pageant removed the swimsuit competition and replaced it with an athleticwear round.

See also 
 Bikini in popular culture
 Victoria's Secret Fashion Show
 Wet T-shirt contest
 Women's beachwear fashion

References

External links 

Competitions
Sports entertainment
Swimsuits